Marilyn Slaby (born November 19, 1939) is a former Republican member of the Ohio House of Representatives, who served the 41st District from her appointment in 2012 to 2018. She served the same district in 2004. She is the wife of former representative Lynn Slaby.

Life and career

A graduate of Heidelberg College, Slaby worked as an educator for much of her life and for ten years has served on the Summit County Board of Elections. Slaby serves as vice-chair of the Summit County Central Committee and is an elected member of the Republican State Central Committee.  She has owned multiple small businesses.

Slaby, and her husband, former Rep. Lynn Slaby, have three children and four grandchildren.

Ohio House of Representatives
In 2004, Rep. Bryan C. Williams resigned from District 41, forcing House Republicans to find a successor. Eventually, Slaby was appointed to the vacancy, and was established as the candidate for the general election. However, she lost the general election to Brian Williams, a Democrat, by less than 300 votes.

Williams lost reelection in 2010, to Slaby's husband, Lynn Slaby. In early 2012, then-Governor John Kasich appointed Lynn Slaby to the Public Ulilities Commission of Ohio (aka PUCO), leaving the seat vacant, once again. For the second time, Marilyn Slaby was appointed to the position. She was sworn into office on April 24, 2012, and serves on the committees of Economic and Small Business Development; Health and Aging; and Insurance.

Due to Republican-lead redistricting that is facing a legal challenge of gerrymandering, Slaby was able to secure election to District 38 for a full term in November 2012 with 54.55% of the vote over Democrat Michael Kaplan. She defeated Democrat Time Crawford in 2014, and Democrat Judith Lynn Lee in 2016. Slaby filed for re-election in 2018, but withdrew her candidacy in February 2018.

During her tenure, she voted to repeal the corporate franchise tax (HB 510, 2012), lift interest rate limits on credit cards (HB 322, 2012), reduce absentee voting days (HB 238, 2014), allow concealed carry on school property (HB 8, 2014), allow firearms silencers (HB 234, 2014), reduce taxes on oil and gas drilling operations (HB 375, 2014), increase the salary of elected officials, including her own (HB 661, 2014), allow religious expression in public school (HB 425, 2016), roll back energy efficiency standards (HB 114, 2017).

Slaby co-sponsored bills to authorize off-campus religious credits for high school credit (HB 171, 2013), criminalize abortion (HB 248, 2013; HB 69, 2015; HB 294, 2015, 2015; HB 493, 2016), prohibit Syrian refugees from resettling in the US (HB 31, 2015), allow clergy to discriminate (HB 36, 2017), Stand Your Ground (aka Kill at Will) and prohibit municipalities from implementing restrictions on firearms (HB 228, 2017).

During the 2018 Lame Duck Session, Slaby voted for the industry-backed HB 625, which would prohibit municipalities from taxing or banning plastic bags and other packaging containers, HB 228 aka Kill at Will, which would also reduce penalties for Concealed Carry violations, and the anti-abortion heartbeat bill HB 258, even though similar bills have been blocked and/or overturned in every other state that has signed them into law.

References

External links
The Ohio Ladies' Gallery: Rep. Marilyn Slaby

Republican Party members of the Ohio House of Representatives
Living people
Women state legislators in Ohio
1939 births
21st-century American politicians
21st-century American women politicians
People from Copley, Ohio